Night of the Cobra Woman is a 1972 American horror film starring Joy Bang, Marlene Clark, and Roger Garrett.

It was co-produced by New World Pictures and shot in the Philippines. Roger Corman expressed great disappointment in the final product, and thought its main problem was that the script badly lacked logic.

Plot
Lena, a young nurse in World War II Philippines, is bitten by a cobra which formally belonged to a snake cult, and which gives her the powers of eternal life, beauty and sexual prowess, and the ability to turn into a snake. When a pair of UNICEF workers, Joanna and Duff, encounter her many years later, Lena's snake is killed by Duff's pet eagle, leaving Lena no option but to feed on the life-force of young men by having sex with them, starting with Duff.

Cast
 Joy Bang as Joanna
 Marlene Clark as Lena Aruza
 Roger Garrett as Stan Duff
 Vic Diaz as Japanese Soldier / Lopé
 Rosemarie Gil as Francisca, Lope's mother
 Vic Silayan as Dr. Tezon

Release

Home media
The film was released for the first time on Blu-ray on July 5, 2017 by Scorpion Releasing.

Reception

Dennis Schwartz from Ozus' World Movie Reviews awarded the film a grade C−, criticizing the film's acting, poor direction, and cheap production values.
TV Guide awarded the film 1/5 stars, calling it "silly" and 'not particularly scary'.

See also
 List of American films of 1972

References

External links

1972 horror films
1972 films
1970s exploitation films
American horror films
New World Pictures films
Films shot in the Philippines
Cockfighting in film
1970s English-language films
1970s American films